Hanna Maron (22 November 1923 – 30 May 2014) was a German-born Israeli actress, comedian and theater personality.
She held the world record for the longest career in theater.

Life and career

Hanna Meierzak was born in Berlin, Germany on 22 November 1923. As a child, she appeared in several plays, films, and radio plays. In 1931 she appeared uncredited in Fritz Lang's M. She attended a Montessori school where she learned French. In 1932, she spent a year in Paris. In 1933, following the Nazi Party's rise to power, she immigrated with her family to Mandate Palestine.

In 1940, she joined Habimah. During World War II, she volunteered for the Auxiliary Territorial Service of the British army, serving two years before joining the Jewish Brigade's entertainment troupe. In 1945 she joined the Cameri Theater in Tel Aviv. As a member of the repertory committee, she helped shape the company's repertoire, including new works by Israeli dramatists. Early on, she appeared in supporting roles, but after her success as Mika in He Walked in the Fields by Moshe Shamir, she became one of Israel's leading actresses.

She married a fellow actor, Yossi Yadin (son of the archaeologist Eleazar Sukenik and brother of the Israeli Chief of Staff Yigael Yadin). They were together for six years. Among her better known roles were in Pygmalion, The Glass Menagerie and Hello, Dolly!, as well as several plays by Nathan Alterman.

On 10 February 1970, the airport bus transport to her London-bound El Al flight at the Munich-Riem Airport was attacked by Palestinian terrorists. Sustaining serious injuries in a grenade attack, her leg had to be amputated, but she resumed her acting career a year later. She remained a peace activist.

She starred in the films Aunt Clara (1977), The Vulture (1981) and Dead End Street (1982). From 1983 to 1986 she starred in the Israeli sitcom Krovim, Krovim ("Near Ones, Dear Ones"). In 2000 she initiated and founded the Herzliya Theater Ensemble. She directed and participated in an evening of Alterman poems, and on an evening of Bertolt Brecht's works. In late 2003, she returned to the Cameri to play in a comedy. In 2004 she starred in a theater event that reenacted an IDF refuseniks' trial.

She was married to architect Yaakov Rechter, with whom she had three children: Amnon, an architect, Ofra, a philosopher, and Dafna, an actress. Hanna Maron died in Tel-Aviv, Israel on 30 May 2014, aged 90.

Legacy in popular culture
A new graphic novel biography is due to appear in German in September 2016: Barbara Yelin, Vor allem eins: Dir selbst sei treu. Die Schauspielerin Channa Maron, lit. First and foremost: be true to yourself. Actress Hanna Maron.

In 2017 an exhibition was created by Barbara Yelin and David Polonsky after Yelin's graphic novel. It was shown at German high schools (the Heinz Berggruen Gymnasium in Berlin and the Humboldt Gymnasium at Vaterstetten), the Berlin International Literature Festival, and the Goethe Institutes in Tel Aviv and Jerusalem.

Awards and honours

 In 1973, Maron was awarded the Israel Prize in theatre.
 In 1994, she received an honorary doctorate from Tel Aviv University.
 In 2007, she received an honorary doctorate from Ben-Gurion University.
 Ynet dubbed her "The first lady of Israeli theater".
 She was cited as an inspiration by many Israeli actors, including Yehoram Gaon and Gila Almagor.

See also
List of Israel Prize recipients

References

External links

1923 births
2014 deaths
German film actresses
German silent film actresses
Israeli film actresses
Israeli stage actresses
Hijacking survivors
Israeli television actresses
Israel Prize in theatre recipients
Israel Prize women recipients
Survivors of terrorist attacks
Jewish emigrants from Nazi Germany to Mandatory Palestine
Actresses from Berlin
20th-century German actresses
Auxiliary Territorial Service soldiers
Israeli amputees